Live at Shepherds Bush Empire may refer to:

 Live at Shepherds Bush Empire (album), a 2004 album by Gary Numan
 Live at Shepherds Bush Empire (EP), a 2007 EP by The Rifles
 Live at Shepherds Bush Empire (Bellowhead video), 2009
 Live at Shepherds Bush Empire (Björk video), 2001
 Live at the Shepherds Bush Empire, a 1999 album by Ezio
 Live at Shepherd's Bush (Stephen Stills album), 2009
 Live! At Shepherd's Bush, London, a 2011 video album by Europe